Maximiliano "Max" Schnettler Ramírez (born January 30, 1986) is a male freestyle swimmer from Chile. He competed for his native South American country at the 2004 Summer Olympics, and also swam at the 2003 Pan American Games.

Notes

References

External links
 
 
 

1986 births
Living people
Chilean male freestyle swimmers
Swimmers at the 2003 Pan American Games
Swimmers at the 2007 Pan American Games
Swimmers at the 2004 Summer Olympics
Olympic swimmers of Chile
Chilean people of German descent
Pan American Games competitors for Chile
South American Games gold medalists for Chile
South American Games silver medalists for Chile
South American Games medalists in swimming
Competitors at the 2002 South American Games
Competitors at the 2006 South American Games
21st-century Chilean people